There were 15 Shooting events at the 2018 South American Games in Cochabamba, Bolivia. Six for men, six for women and three mixed gender events. The events were held between June 2 and 7 at the Escuela Militar de Sargentos del Ejercito. This event was a qualification event for the 2019 Pan American Games in Lima, Peru.

Medal summary

Medal table

Medallists
Athletes in bold qualify their nation a quota spot for their respective discipline for the 2019 Pan American Games.
Men

Women's events

Mixed pairs events

See also
Shooting at the 2019 Pan American Games – Qualification

References

2018 South American Games events
2018
Qualification tournaments for the 2019 Pan American Games
2018 in shooting sports